Samuel Ludwik Zasadius or Zasadyus, Sassadius (c. 1695–1756) was a Polish religious writer, pastor and author of popular sermons and prayer-books. He was also known for propagating Polishness in Cieszyn Silesia.

Biography
Zasadius was born c. 1695 in Komorzno as the son of a Polish pastor. He studied in Wittenberg and Jena. In the years of 1721–1730 Zasadius was a deacon and preacher of Jesus Church in Cieszyn.

He led educational activity, published Polish magazines and learned the Polish language. In 1730 he was expelled (with pastors Johann Adam Steinmetz and Jan Muthmann) from the  Austrian monarchy for being in favour of the Pietism movement. He stayed in Germany until 1742. After returning, he became a pastor in Tarnowskie Góry where he died on 25 March 1756.

Works
Zasadius is an author of popular prayer-books and song-books, such as Mleczna potrawa duchowa... (1726), catechism Droga do nieba... (1723), collection of orations Kazania pokutne (1730, online). He translated a New Testament (1725), The Small Catechism by Martin Luther (1727) and other Luther works.

Further reading

References

1695 births
1756 deaths
Lutheran writers
People from Cieszyn Silesia
Polish Lutherans
Polish publishers (people)
Polish male writers
Polish translators
Religious writers
Translators of the Bible into Polish
University of Jena alumni
University of Wittenberg alumni
People from Kluczbork County
18th-century translators